Gance is a French surname. Notable people with the surname include:

Abel Gance (1889–1981), French film director, producer, writer, and actor
Henri Gance (1888–1953), French weightlifter

See also
Gane

French-language surnames